The Yenikend Hydro Power Plant is one of Azerbaijan's largest hydro power plant having an installed electric capacity of .

See also
 List of power stations in Azerbaijan

References

External links

Hydroelectric power stations in Azerbaijan